Expanding toy may mean:

 Grow monsters, toys that expand in water
 Hoberman sphere